Taqan (also Romanized as Ţāqān and Ţāghān) is a village in Firuzeh Rural District, in the Central District of Firuzeh County, Razavi Khorasan Province, Iran. At the 2006 census, its population was 166, in 48 families.

References 

Populated places in Firuzeh County